Gardiner is an English surname. Notable people with the surname include:

 Addison Gardiner (1797–1883), New York Lieutenant Governor and Chief Judge
 Ainsley Gardiner, film producer from New Zealand
 Sir Alan Gardiner (1879–1963), English Egyptologist
 Albert Gardiner, Australian politician
 Alfred George Gardiner (1865–1946), English journalist and essayist
 Allen Francis Gardiner (1794–1851), English missionary
 Anthony W. Gardiner (1820–1885), President of Liberia
 Antoinette Avril Gardiner (born 1941), known as Princess Muna al-Hussein, second wife of King Hussein of Jordan
 Asa Bird Gardiner (1839–1919), American lawyer and politician
 Barry Gardiner (born 1957), Scottish politician
 Bernard Gardiner (c. 1668–1726), English academic administrator
 Boris Gardiner (born 1943), Jamaican reggae musician
 Charlie Gardiner (ice hockey player) (1904–1934), Scottish-born Canadian ice hockey player
 Charles Gardiner (1720–1769), Irish politician and landowner
 Charles Gardiner, 1st Earl of Blessington (1782–1829), socialite
 Chittampalam Abraham Gardiner, Sri Lankan businessman and prominent Roman Catholic activist
 Chris Gardiner (born 1986), Scottish footballer
 Crispin Gardiner (born 1942), New Zealand physicist
 Darcy Gardiner (born 1995), Australian rules footballer
 David Gardiner (footballer) (born 1957), Guatemalan footballer
 Eve Gardiner (1913–1992), English beautician and remedial make-up artist
 Frank Gardiner, Scottish-born Australian bushranger
 Fred Gardiner, Toronto politician
 Sir George Gardiner (politician) (1935–2002), English politician
 George Barnet Gardiner (1852-1910), folk-song collector in England and Scotland
 George Gardiner (settler) (c 1610) of Rhode Island
 George Gardiner (soldier) (1821–1891), Irish recipient of the Victoria Cross
 Gerald Gardiner, Baron Gardiner (1900–1990), Lord Chancellor of the United Kingdom
 Harry Gardiner (born 1871), American buildings climber
 Harry Gardiner (footballer), Scottish footballer
 Henry Balfour Gardiner (1877–1950), English composer
 Herb Gardiner (1891–1972), Canadian ice hockey player
 Ian Gardiner (disambiguation), several people
 Jake Gardiner, Canadian hockey player
 James Gardiner (British Army officer) (1688–1745), Scottish soldier
 James Garfield Gardiner (1883–1962), Canadian politician
 James Henry Gardiner, early Australian Rules Footballer
 James McDonald Gardiner, (1857–1925), American architect, educator and lay missionary to Japan
 James Terry Gardiner (1842–1912), American surveyor
 Jane Gardiner, schoolmistress, grammarian
 Jeane Gardiner, Bermudian alleged witch
 John Gardiner (Australia) (1873–1878), Irish-born settler in Australia
 Sir John Eliot Gardiner (born 1943), English conductor
 John Reynolds Gardiner, American novelist
 John Stanley Gardiner (1872–1946), British zoologist
 John Sylvester John Gardiner (1765–1830), Welsh-born American clergyman
 John Gardiner (businessman) (born 1936), British businessman.
 Joseph Gardiner (Western Australian politician) (1886–1965), member of the Western Australian Legislative Assembly
 Joseph Gardiner (New South Wales politician) (1879–1941), member of the New South Wales Legislative Council
 Joe Gardiner, English footballer
 Les Gardiner (Scottish footballer) (born 1918)
 Lion Gardiner (1599–1663), English settler in New York
 Luke Gardiner (1690–1755), Irish politician
 Luke Gardiner, 1st Viscount Mountjoy (1745–1798), Irish politician and property developer
 Marguerite Gardiner, Countess of Blessington (1789–1849), Irish writer
 Marshall G. Gardiner (1912–1999), American journalist and politician
 Michael Gardiner, Australian rules footballer
 Muriel Gardiner, American psychiatrist
 Pauline Gardiner, New Zealand politician
 Peter Gardiner, Swedish actor and dancer
 Reginald Gardiner (1903–1980), English actor
 Richard Gardiner (disambiguation)
 Ricky Gardiner, Scottish musician
 Robert Gardiner (disambiguation), several people
 Samuel Rawson Gardiner (1829–1902), English historian
 Silvester Gardiner (1707–1786), American physician and land developer
 Simon Gardiner (born 1975), Prominent Scouser and world record neck size
 Stephen Gardiner (c. 1493–1555), English Lord Chancellor and bishop
 Steven Gardiner (born 1995), Bahamian track and field sprinter
 Susan Gardiner (born 1980), Canadian water polo player
 Thomas A. Gardiner (1832–1881), New York politician
 William Gardiner (botanist) (1808-1852), Scottish poet botanist and umbrella maker.
 William Guthrie Gardiner, ship owner and philanthropist 
 Wrey Gardiner (1901–1981), English writer, poet, editor and publisher

See also
 Lord Gardiner (disambiguation)
 Baron Gardiner
 Gaertner
 Gardiner (disambiguation)
 Gardner (disambiguation)
 Gardinier

English-language surnames
Occupational surnames
English-language occupational surnames